Yvan Marie (10 May 1913 – 9 April 1988) was a French racing cyclist. He rode in the 1948 Tour de France.

References

External links
 

1913 births
1988 deaths
French male cyclists
Sportspeople from Calvados (department)
Cyclists from Normandy